Wakefield Park Raceway was a  motor racing circuit located near Goulburn, New South Wales, Australia. It is named after Charles Wakefield, the founder of Castrol. The founders of Wakefield Park, John Carter and amateur racer and former motor dealer, Paul Samuels felt that Castrol had been so influential in helping amateurs go motor racing that CC Wakefield should be honoured, especially as Samuels' and Carter's’ circuit was intended for amateur racers in the likelihood in the 1990s of both Amaroo and Oran Park Raceways closing and amateur racers being unable to afford the daily hire rate at Eastern Creek Raceway.

The local arm of Castrol appreciated this and committed to a three-year sum for sponsorship. Consequently, all the buildings, which were all designed by Samuels and Carter, were in Castrol colours, an appropriate but subtle recognition of the Company's involvement. However it was then decided that Castrol was not getting any appreciable value from the modest sponsorship, so it stopped.

History
It was the first privately funded circuit built in NSW in the last 35 years and, says Samuels, "when confronting neighbours and the EPA, I can see why". It took them more than a year, despite the help of Goulburn Council and the local member John Fahey, to find a place that finally gained all the necessary approvals. However it took less than eight months from turning the first sod in mid-October 1993 to its first meeting on 8 May 1994. The total cost of the land and work was $1.2 mill.

Goulburn was chosen as it was close to Canberra, the large population areas of the near south coast around Wollongong, was not too far from Sydney and a three-hour easier journey for Victorians than if it had been close to Sydney.

The road racing circuit has hosted the Fujitsu V8 Supercar Series, the Australian Superbike Championship, the Australian Motor Racing Series, drifting, as well as state and club level racing, also Speed off the Streets and motorcycle ride days.

Wakefield Park operates under a CAMS National Circuit Licence, AASA and also under the Department of Sport and Recreation permit scheme.

There are no trees or natural obstacles near the track. Safety is paramount and ripple strips, tyre walls and gravel traps have been positioned so as to make Wakefield a very safe circuit on which to run any type of racecar, production car or motorcycle. The track was resurfaced by its new owners, Winton Motor Raceway, in late 2007.

The track is open to the public providing three circuits licensed by the NSW Department of Sport and Recreation, CAMS, and Motorcycling NSW Inc and Australian Karting Association Inc. Commercial "thrill rides" operate there.

There is also a hill climb and short variations of the circuit.

Wakefield Park is the title of a 2010 short film with Michael Fitzgerald which was filmed at the circuit.

Having had the number of days on which it operate cut to 30 days per annum after a lengthy legal battle, the circuit closed in August 2022.

A e-petition was submitted to the NSW Legislative Assembly following the closure of the motorsport park which amassed 28,950 signatures upon closure on October 28, 2022, currently holding the record of the highest amount of signatures ever collected on an e-petition within NSW Government history. The petition was tabled in the Legislative Assembly on November 8, 2022 and later responded to by the Minister of Planning on December 13, 2022.

The Benalla Auto Club sold the circuit to Steve Shelley in 2023, the owner of the Pheasant Wood Circuit located in nearby Marulan NSW, with the new owner intending to work with the local community and Goulburn Mulwaree Council to re-open the facility.

Lap records

As of August 2022, the official race lap records at Wakefield Park are listed as:

References

External links
Wakefield Park Raceway
Lap of Wakefield Park in MINI Cooper S
 

Wakefield Park
Wakefield Park
Wakefield Park
Wakefield Park
Wakefield Park